Robin Barnes is an American jazz singer and fitness leader from New Orleans, Louisiana, United States, best known for her jazz EP "Songbird Sessions" released in 2016.

Early life
Barnes was born in New Orleans, Louisiana and grew up around a family of musicians, including Dave Bartholomew. Barnes came from gospel and jazz roots, and started singing at 6 in her church choir. After a solo performance of “Ave Maria," she decided she wanted to be a singer.

Career

Business 
Barnes holds a bachelor's degree from the University of New Orleans in business management and a master's degree in business administration. When she returned from Greece, she was diagnosed with a rare kidney infection and changed her diet. After the diagnosis, Barnes founded Fit by You/Move Ya Brass, a New Orleans-centric fitness lifestyle group. Barnes was featured on Forbes 40 under 40 in 2014 for her workout wear.

Barnes is the At-Large Director on The University of New Orleans International Alumni Board and serves as a member on The Beautiful Foundation, serving uplifting young women.

Music 
In 2011, she made music her full-time career. Barnes’ first gig was in the Hotel Monteleone where she still holds a residency along with the Windsor Court. She has grown in popularity since her debut in the United States and in Europe. Barnes has been named the “Songbird of New Orleans" by several media outlets.

Barnes won “Favorite New Orleans Musician” by New Orleans magazine as well as Gambit Magazine’s artist to watch in 2015.

She released five songs on her Jazz EP Songbird Sessions on Aug. 26, 2016 through Rhythm Elevation Records. The album was made with bassist Pat Casey. Robin cites influences including Allen Toussaint and Irma Thomas. Percussionists Riley and Powell and guitarists Masakowski and Danny Abel also appear. Songbird Sessions debuted at number 5 on the Traditional Jazz Albums Billboard Charts. Her album was also number 8 on the Current Jazz Albums chart.

Barnes is currently working on a full-length album.

References

Year of birth missing (living people)
Living people
Jazz musicians from New Orleans
University of New Orleans alumni
American fashion designers